Antarctica is the southernmost continent on Earth. While Antarctica has never had a permanent human population, it has been explored by various groups, and many locations on and around the continent have been described. This page lists notable places in and immediately surrounding the Antarctic continent, including geographic features, bodies of water, and human settlements.

Bodies of water 

Antarctica is a desert, receiving very little annual precipitation. However meltwater from the continent's ice features produce a number of rivers and streams. A list of these can be found at List of rivers of Antarctica

Ice 
As such, a number of notable ice features have been described on the continent.

Ice shelves 

In many places, continental ice sheets extend from the continent forming massive ice shelves.

A list of Antarctic ice shelves can be found at List of Antarctic ice shelves.

Ice streams

Islands 

A large number of islands surround Antarctica. For a list of them, see List of Antarctic and subantarctic islands.

Geographic features

Ridges and rock features 
 Austranten Rock
 Avalanche Corrie

Mountains and hills 

There are a number of mountain lists for Antarctica:

List of mountains of Enderby Land
List of mountains of Wilkes Land
List of mountains of Queen Maud Land
List of mountains of East Antarctica
List of Ultras of Antarctica
List of mountains of Princess Elizabeth Land
List of mountains of Mac. Robertson Land

To be added to lists are:
 Alexander Peak, Haines Mountains, Ford Ranges, Marie Byrd Land
 Atwater Hill
 Brand Peak
 Buennagel Peak, Haines Mountains, Ford Ranges, Marie Byrd Land
 Buettner Peak, Mount Murphy massif, Marie Byrd Land
 Buggisch Peak, Edson Hills, in the Heritage Range, Ellsworth Mountains, Marie Byrd Land.
 Lester Peak, Edson Hills, in the Heritage Range, Ellsworth Mountains, Marie Byrd Land.
 Mount Arrowsmith
 Mount Atholl
 Mount Axtell
 Mount Boda
 Mount Bodys
 Mount Brading
 Mount Murphy massif, Bucher Peak, Marie Byrd Land
 Mount Byerly, Marie Byrd Land
 Pirrit Hills

Volcanoes 

Antarctica has a number of active and extinct volcanoes. For a list of them, see List of volcanoes in Antarctica.

Human settlements 

Antarctica has no permanent human population. However, there are a variety of man-made places in Antarctica including two civilian bases.

Lighthouses

Research stations

References 

Places
Antarctica